Westshore is a northern coastal suburb of the city of Napier in Hawke's Bay, New Zealand.

History
The first European settlers built houses on Westshore in 1850, when it was little more than a sandspit. Prior to the 1931 Hawke's Bay earthquake, Westshore was already a popular seaside resort, a long-time popular spot for yachting and boating activities. In 1931 the earthquake struck Napier, reclaiming the Ahuriri Lagoon. This freed up land and allowed Westshore to expand as a suburb, as previously a narrow shingle spit was the only land available. The earthquake also transformed the previously dangerous and shingly seashore into a safe and sandy swimming beach. Projects such as beach front beautification, landscaping and other improvements have helped to make Westshore one of the most popular and preferred beaches in Napier.

The Napier Swimming and Lifesaving Club was amongst the earliest Surf Lifesaving Clubs active in New Zealand, beginning in the 1910s. In October, 1958 the new Surf Section of the Napier Swimming and Lifesaving Club commenced patrols at Westshore Beach which, with improved access, had become the preferred swimming beach for the Napier public. The members of this new section wanted to form their own club, and on 28 October 1959 the Westshore Surf Lifesaving Club was formed. The Club operates from a two-story clubrooms building which opened in 1963 near the beachfront. Westshore is patrolled by surf-lifesavers in the summer months.

Geography

Westshore is located on the northern coast of Napier on the shores of the Hawke Bay. The 1931 earthquake freed up land which was previously underwater as part of the Ahuriri lagoon, and transformed the once dangerous shingle shore into a safe and sandy beach. Recreational activities popular at Westshore beach include swimming, picnicking and sunbathing. The earthquake raised the coastal land around Napier by about two metres. With the land that was made available, housing in Westshore increased, and there are also many motels in the suburb. Reclaimed land also includes the land on which the Hawke's Bay Airport was built. Westshore is one of Napier's most popular beaches. Relative to the steep and shingle beach on the foreshore of Marine Parade, Westshore is the more preferred swimming beach in Napier.

Demographics

Westshore had a population of 1,143 at the 2018 New Zealand census, an increase of 84 people (7.9%) since the 2013 census, and an increase of 69 people (6.4%) since the 2006 census. There were 498 households, comprising 543 males and 600 females, giving a sex ratio of 0.91 males per female. The median age was 50.3 years (compared with 37.4 years nationally), with 168 people (14.7%) aged under 15 years, 162 (14.2%) aged 15 to 29, 516 (45.1%) aged 30 to 64, and 297 (26.0%) aged 65 or older.

Ethnicities were 87.7% European/Pākehā, 15.2% Māori, 1.8% Pacific peoples, 3.7% Asian, and 2.9% other ethnicities. People may identify with more than one ethnicity.

The percentage of people born overseas was 17.6, compared with 27.1% nationally.

Although some people chose not to answer the census's question about religious affiliation, 47.0% had no religion, 42.3% were Christian, 0.5% had Māori religious beliefs, 0.5% were Hindu, 0.3% were Muslim, 0.3% were Buddhist and 1.6% had other religions.

Of those at least 15 years old, 216 (22.2%) people had a bachelor's or higher degree, and 153 (15.7%) people had no formal qualifications. The median income was $34,900, compared with $31,800 nationally. 180 people (18.5%) earned over $70,000 compared to 17.2% nationally. The employment status of those at least 15 was that 462 (47.4%) people were employed full-time, 159 (16.3%) were part-time, and 24 (2.5%) were unemployed.

Education

References

Beaches of the Hawke's Bay Region
Suburbs of Napier, New Zealand
Populated places around Hawke Bay